The Frankfurt University Library (German: Universitätsbibliothek Frankfurt am Main (UB Frankfurt), or Universitätsbibliothek Johann Christian Senckenberg, ISIL DE-30) is the library for the Goethe University of Frankfurt, Germany.

History
It originated in the 15th century as a town library. After the founding of the university (1914) it became the Stadt- und Universitätsbibliothek Frankfurt am Main (StUB).

Library Profile
The Frankfurt University Library is one of the largest academic libraries in Germany and a member of the Collection of German Prints, the virtual German national library, covering the years 1801 till 1870. In 2021, the library has had 805,019 visitors.

Central library
 Zentralbibliothek (central library), Bockenheimer Landstr. 134–138, 60325 Frankfurt am Main (ISIL DE-30) (Library card or Goethe card is required to visit the reading rooms)

Branches
Sources:

 Medizinische Hauptbibliothek (medicine), Theodor-Stern-Kai 7, Haus 10, 60596 Frankfurt am Main
 Bibliothek Naturwissenschaften (natural sciences), Ruth-Moufang-Str. 2, 60438 Frankfurt am Main
 Bibliothek Recht und Wirtschaft (law and economy), Theodor-W.-Adorno-Platz 4, 60323 Frankfurt am Main
 Bibliothek Sozialwissenschaften und Psychologie (BSP) (social sciences and psychology), Theodor-W.-Adorno-Platz 6, 60323 Frankfurt am Main
 Bibliothek Sprach- und Kulturwissenschaften (linguistics and cultural studies), Rostocker Straße 2, 60323 Frankfurt am Main
 Bibliothekszentrum Geisteswissenschaften (humanities), IG Farben Building (Q1 und Q6), Norbert-Wollheim-Platz 1, 60323 Frankfurt am Main
 Bibliothek für Sportwissenschaften (sports science), Ginnheimer Landstraße 39, 60487 Frankfurt am Main
 Mathematikbibliothek (mathematics), Robert-Mayer-Straße 8, 60325 Frankfurt am Main
 Informatikbibliothek (computing), Robert-Mayer-Straße 11–15, 60325 Frankfurt am Main

Collections
Since 1802, the library owns an original complete Gutenberg Bible.
The UB Frankfurt possesses the largest Judaica and Hebraica collection in Germany.

Building
The modern library building by Ferdinand Kramer was erected in 1964 and inaugurated on 29 April 1965. At the entrance to the reading rooms stands the bronze figure Prometheus by Ossip Zadkine.

Gallery

References

External links

  
 Geschichte der Stadt- und Universitätsbibliothek Frankfurt am Main
 

Library
Academic libraries in Germany
1480s establishments in the Holy Roman Empire
1484 establishments in Europe
Library buildings completed in 1964
Deposit libraries
Libraries established in the 15th century